Bhagyodaya is a 1956 Indian Kannada-language film directed by P. V. Babu.
The film stars Sowkar Janaki and T. R. Narasimha Raju. This was the 61st talkie movie made in Kannada industry since its inception in 1934. This was the debut movie of actor Udaykumar.

Cast
Sowkar Janaki
T. R. Narasimha Raju
Udaykumar
Pandari Bai
Kowshik

Production
The film was produced by N. Bhakta Vatsalan and A. C. Narasimha Murthy under the banner Udaya Productions. Cinematography was done by C. A. Madhusudhan.

The film was dubbed into Tamil language with the title Chinna Marumagal and was released in 1960. It was produced by K. Ramanathan and the film was edited by K. Ganesan.

Soundtrack
The music was composed by L. Malleswara Rao. while the lyrics were penned by K. Prabhakar Sastri. Playback singers were R. Balasaraswathi Devi, K. Rani, Subrahmaniyam and Madhavapeddi Satyam.

References

External links
 - a song from the film
 - song by Madhavapeddi Sathyam
 - Tamil full film

1950s Kannada-language films
1956 films
Indian black-and-white films